Herbert Wiles was a professional rugby league footballer who played in the 1890s and 1900s. He played at club level for Hull F.C.

References

External links
Search for "Wiles" at rugbyleagueproject.org
Stats → Past Players → "W"
Statistics at hullfc.com

Hull F.C. players
Place of birth missing
Place of death missing
Rugby league players
Year of birth missing
Year of death missing